SAM-VI is a member of the riboswitch family. It is predominantly found in Bifidobacterium and exhibits some similarities to the SAM-III (Smk box) riboswitch class, but lacks most of the highly conserved nucleotides of SAM-III class.  SAM-VI aptamers bind the cofactor  S-adenosylmethinine SAM (a key metabolite in sulphur metabolism) and discriminate strongly against S-adenosylhomocysteine SAH. The class was discovered by further analysis of Bifido-meK motif RNAs.

See also 
 SAM-I riboswitch
 SAM-II riboswitch
 SAM-III riboswitch
 SAM-IV riboswitch
 SAM-V riboswitch

References

Cis-regulatory RNA elements
Riboswitch